TIFA may refer to:

Toronto International Festival of Authors
Trade and Investment Framework Agreement